is a Japanese shōjo manga magazine published by Shogakukan. The magazine launched in 1977 and always comes with a free gift which used to always be paper crafts, but now varies every month. The magazine's competitors are Ribon and Nakayoshi. Manga published in Ciao are released under the Ciao Comics imprint.

Serializations

Current
 Kocchi Muite! Miiko (1995–present)
 The Magic of Chocolate (2009–present)
 Ningen Kaishūsha (2012–present)
 Yo-kai Watch: Exciting Nyanderful Days (2014–present)
 My New Life as a Cat (2015–present)
 Aikatsu Friends! (2018–present)
 Aikatsu On Parade! (2019–present)

Past

1977-1989

 Alpen Rose (1983-1986)
 Pink na Kimi ni Blue na Boku (1984-1988)
 Slow Step (1986-1991)
 Chiki Chiki Bom! (1989-1990)

1990-1999

 Mizuiro Jidai (1991-1994)
 Muka Muka Paradise (1993-1994)
 Tonde Burin (1994-1995)
 Wedding Peach (1994-1996)
 Angel Lip (1996-1999)
 Revolutionary Girl Utena (1996-1998)
 Cutie Honey Flash (1997-1998)
 Magical Pokémon Journey (1997-2003)
 Hamtaro (1997-2000)
 Corrector Yui (1999-2000)
 Pukupuku Natural Circular Notice (1999-2005)
 Ask Dr. Rin! (1999-2003)

2000-2009

 Mirmo de Pon! (2001-2005)
 Panyo Panyo Di Gi Charat (2001-2003)
 Fall in Love Like a Comic! (2002)
 Beauty Pop (2003-2008)
 Kirarin Revolution (2004-2009)
 Twin Princess of Wonder Planet (2005-2006)
 Happy Happy Clover (2005-2008)
 Naisho no Tsubomi (2005-2012)
 Gokujō!! Mecha Mote Iinchō (2006-2014)
 Dennō Coil: The Comics (2007)
 Chibi Devi! (2008-2014)
 Miracle Revolution: Kusumi Koharu no Monogatari (2009)
 Kings of My Love (2009-2014)
 Hime Gal Paradise (2009-2010)

2010-2019
 Kururun-Rieru Change! (2010)
 Mahochu! (2010-2012)
 Niji-iro Prism Girl (2010-2013)
 Puriri! Lilpri (2011)
 Pretty Rhythm: Aurora Dream (2011-2012)
 Secret Girls: Naisho no Idol (2011-2013)
 Elite Jack!! (2012)
 Age 12 (2012-2019)
 Twinkle Collection (2013-2014)
 PriPara (2014-2017)
 Koi Shite! Runa Kiss (2014-2018)
 Aikatsu!: Secret Story (2014)
 Aikatsu!: Next Phase (2014)
 Aikatsu!: Go! Go! Go! (2015-2016)
 Aikatsu Stars! (2016-2018)
 Ijime (2015-2019)
 PriPri Chi-chan!! (2015-2019)
 Idol × Warrior Miracle Tunes! Kirakira Fever Live (2017-2018)

References

External links
 Ciao Land official website 

Monthly manga magazines published in Japan
Shōjo manga magazines
Magazines established in 1977
Shogakukan magazines
1977 establishments in Japan
Magazines published in Tokyo